Pelzia is a genus of moths belonging to the subfamily Tortricinae of the family Tortricidae. It consists of only one species, Pelzia alticolana, which is found in Ecuador (Carchi Province).

The wingspan is about 24 mm. The ground colour of the forewings is pale brownish cream, in the distal third of the wing tinged with ferruginous and sprinkled and suffused with brown. The hindwings are whitish, but dirty cream terminally.

Etymology
The generic name is a patronym for Dr. Volker Pelz. The specific name refers to the high altitude of the collection site of the species and is derived from Latin altus (meaning high) and colana (meaning resident).

See also
List of Tortricidae genera

References

Euliini